Federal Government Girls' College, Owerri is a secondary school in Owerri, Imo State, Nigeria. It is a model secondary school for girls, which was established in 1973. The first principal of the school was Ms Sheila Everard, the current principal is Mrs. Obiagwu Francisca Chinwe. Being one of the country's “Unity Schools”, it was founded after the Nigerian civil war to "promote integration among ethnic groups and to discourage divisions and tribalism". Local languages such as Igbo were taught at the institution, albeit speaking them outside the classroom was a punishable offence. According to the BBC, straightening one's hair was banned in the school.

The school was built on a piece of land cut out of their closest neighbours, Government Secondary School Owerri. There were instances of tension between the students of both schools. The school uniform comprises blue shirts with navy blue skirts for the senior girls, and pinafores for the junior girls.

Notable alumni
Ezinne Akudo, lawyer and beauty queen
Adaobi Tricia Nwaubani, novelist, humorist, essayist and journalist
Nnenna Elendu Ukeje, politician
Ola Uduku, architect and professor

References

External links
website

Educational institutions established in 1973
1973 establishments in Nigeria
Girls' schools in Nigeria
Owerri
Secondary schools in Imo State